Hovea apiculata, is a species of flowering plant in the family Fabaceae and is endemic to eastern Australia. It is a shrub with white to greyish or light brown hairs, narrowly oblong leaves with stipules at the base, and purplish and deep mauve, pea-like flowers.

Description

Taxonomy and naming
Hovea apiculata was first formally described in 1832 by George Don in his book, A General History of Dichlamydeous, from an unpublished description by Allan Cunningham. The specific epithet (apiculata) means "apiculate".

Distribution and habitat
This species of pea grows in forest and woodland on sandy soils in south-eastern Queensland including in the Expedition National Park, and west of the Great Dividing Range in New South Wales as far south as Dubbo.

References

apiculata
Flora of Queensland
Flora of New South Wales
Fabales of Australia
Plants described in 1832
Taxa named by George Don